Hughes Park station is a SEPTA rapid transit station in Upper Merion Township, Pennsylvania. It serves the Norristown High Speed Line (Route 100) and is located at Yerkes Road and Crooked Lane. All trains stop at Hughes Park. Trains known as the Hughes Park Express terminate here and operate to 69th Street, skipping certain stops along the way.

Station layout

External links

 Yerkes Road entrance from Google Maps Street View

SEPTA Norristown High Speed Line stations